Gjoa Haven Airport  is located  southwest of Gjoa Haven, Nunavut, Canada, and is operated by the government of Nunavut.

The airport is a single storey building and located next to several trailers. The runway and taxiways are packed gravel or dirt. The runway is not marked and other than a non-directional beacon (NDB), lacks navigation aids.

Airlines and destinations

Gjoa Haven Airport Gallery

References

External links

Certified airports in the Kitikmeot Region
Gjoa Haven